commonly known as SC Sagamihara (SC相模原, Esu Shī Sagamihara) is a Japanese association football club based in Sagamihara, Kanagawa Prefecture. They currently play in the J3 League, Japanese third tier of professional football.

History
In 2011 they joined the Division 2 of the Kanto Football League after three years of consecutive promotions through the Kanagawa Prefectural League. In 2012, they won the Regional Promotion Series and were promoted to the Japan Football League. Since 2014, the club has belonged to the recently established J3 League, where they played for seven seasons before being promoted to J2 League in 2020 as J3 runners-up.

After just a season in J2, Sagamihara returned to the J3 for the 2022 season, having been relegated from the J2 being three points off the relegation zone. On 2023, the club will play their 2nd consecutive season at the J2.

Among their players, former Japan national member Yoshikatsu Kawaguchi has featured for SC Sagamihara.

League and cup record

Key

Honours
Regional Football League Competition
 Winners (1): 2012
National Club Team Football Championship
 Winners (1): 2008

Current squad
As of 10 March 2023.

Coaching Staff
For the 2022 season.

Managerial history

Kit evolution

References

External links
 Official site 

 
Sagamihara
Sagamihara
2008 establishments in Japan
Sports teams in Kanagawa Prefecture
Sagamihara
Japan Football League clubs
J.League clubs